Elspeth Hay, also known by her married name Elspeth Graham, (born 1929/30) is a British former sprinter who won a gold medal in the 4 x 100 metres relay at the 1950 European Athletics Championships.

Career
Hay was scheduled to compete at the 1948 Summer Olympics in London, but was injured in training prior to the event. In 1950, she competed in the European Athletics Championships; in doing so, she became the first Scottish person to compete at the European Athletics Championships. She came fifth in the individual 100 metres event, and was a member of the gold medal-winning Great Britain 4 x 100 metres relay team. In the same year, she won the women's 100-yard dash event at the Edinburgh Highland games.

Post retirement
After her retirement, Hay volunteered almost 40 years for the Women's Royal Voluntary Service. She also worked as a tour guide for a stately home. Graham ran in Balbeggie as part of the torch relay prior to the 2012 Summer Olympics in London. At the time, she was living in Perth.

References

Scottish female sprinters
Sportspeople from Perth, Scotland
Living people
Year of birth uncertain
Year of birth missing (living people)